The Macho River is a tributary of the Mégiscane River, flowing in Quebec, Canada, in the territories of:
Eeyou Istchee James Bay (Municipality), in the administrative region of Nord-du-Québec;
Senneterre, in La Vallée-de-l'Or Regional County Municipality, in the administrative region of Abitibi-Témiscamingue, where the course of the river crosses successively the cantons of Souart, Masères, Closse, Maricourt and Berthelot.

The Macho River flows entirely in forested territory north-east of the La Vérendrye Wildlife Reserve and on the west side of Gouin Reservoir. Forestry is the main economic activity of this hydrographic slope; recreational tourism activities, second.

The surface of the river is usually frozen from mid-December to mid-April. The course of this river has a difference in height of only five meters.

Geography

Toponymy
The toponym "Macho River" was formalized on December 5, 1968, at the Commission de toponymie du Québec.

See also

References

External links 

La Vallée-de-l’Or
Rivers of Abitibi-Témiscamingue
Rivers of Nord-du-Québec
Eeyou Istchee James Bay
Nottaway River drainage basin